Rumex abyssinicus is a species of flowering plant in the family Polygonaceae, native to tropical Africa, including Madagascar.

Taxonomy
Rumex abyssinicus was first described by Nikolaus von Jacquin in 1777. R. arifolius L.f. is a synonym of this species. (R. arifolius All. is a different species, regarded as either a synonym of R. hispanicus, or of R. alpestris.)

References

External links
 
 
 

abyssinicus
Flora of Africa
Plants described in 1777